D. D. Kosambi may refer to:

 Dharmananda Damodar Kosambi (1876–1947), Indian scholar on Buddhism
 Damodar Dharmananda Kosambi (1907–1966), Indian mathematician, historian and polymath